The 1960 United States Senate election in South Dakota took place on November 8, 1960. Incumbent Republican Senator Karl E. Mundt ran for re-election to his third term. He was challenged by Congressman George McGovern. Both Mundt and McGovern won their respective primaries unopposed and the long-awaited campaign between the two began. Despite the landslide victory for Vice-President Richard M. Nixon over John F. Kennedy, the race between Mundt and McGovern was quite close. However, the headwinds proved impossible for McGovern to overcome, and Mundt narrowly won re-election. However, McGovern would run for the U.S. Senate again in 1962, and he would serve alongside Mundt for a decade.

General election

Results

Results by county

References

South Dakota
1960
1960 South Dakota elections